The Chicago Jazz Festival is an admission-free, four-day annual jazz festival in Chicago's Millennium Park. It is run by the Department of Cultural Affairs and Special Events and programmed with the assistance of Jazz Institute of Chicago during Labor Day weekend, integrating international and local artists playing many forms of jazz music.

Inaugural event

Shortly after Duke Ellington's death in 1974, a festival was organized to honor him in Grant Park. More than 10,000 jazz fans attended, and it became an annual event, attracting crowds of up to 30,000. In 1978, another group organized a Grant Park festival to honor John Coltrane. When, in 1979, the Jazz Institute of Chicago began preparations for its own Grant Park Festival, which would have resulted in three separate jazz festivals being held in Grant Park at the end of August, the Mayor's Office of Special Events stepped in and joined the three different festivals together into the Chicago Jazz Festival, which would present a week of free jazz performances. That first Chicago Jazz Festival included an Ellington Night, a Coltrane Night, and five other programs put together by the Jazz Institute of Chicago. Held at Grant Park's new Petrillo Music Shell, first season performers included: Von Freeman, Art Hodes, Benny Carter, McCoy Tyner, Billy Taylor, Mel Torme, and Benny Goodman; and the festival drew 125,000 festival-goers over its seven nights.

Subsequent festivals

For many years, the entire evening Festival performances were broadcast live, coast-to-coast on 180 Public Radio Stations. Later on, highlight shows were assembled for later broadcast, until WBEZ abandoned its long-time jazz broadcasting.

Each year after the concerts are over, jam sessions, sometimes running late into the night and early morning, are hosted by numerous prominent Chicago jazz musicians such as David Boykin, Fred Anderson, Dana Hall, Karl E. H. Seigfried, and Keefe Jackson.

The festival is now part of a summer-long series of concerts and festivals sponsored by the city's Department of Cultural Affairs and Special Events, including Taste of Chicago and the Chicago Blues Festival.

In 2017, the festival moved from Grant Park's badly aging Petrillo Music Shell and its side stages, where it had been held for more than 30 years, across Monroe Street to Millennium Park, where artists appeared at several performance pavilions as well as at the nearby Chicago Cultural Center, Ganz Hall at Roosevelt University, and several other locations. Though this provided better acoustics in the newer venue, some critics complained that the new arrangement unnecessarily scattered the performances, making it harder for attendees to hear some of the sessions because of the distance between the venues.

The jazz festival went on hiatus in 2020 and plans to return the next year.

Performers

Performers have included Miles Davis, Ella Fitzgerald, Anthony Braxton, Betty Carter, Lionel Hampton, Chico O'Farrill's big band, Jimmy Dawkins, Johnny Frigo, Slide Hampton, Roy Haynes, Sarah Vaughan, Carmen McRae, BB King, Count Basie, Sun Ra, Stan Getz, Jimmy Smith, Dexter Gordon, Dizzy Gillespie, Kenny Burrell, Ornette Coleman, and many others.

See also
 List of festivals in Chicago
 Music of Chicago

References

External links
 Chicago Jazz Festival
 Photos and Video Interviews from 2009 Fest
 Photos of 2008 Fest
 Photos of 2007 Fest
 Photos of 2006 Fest
 Chicago Jazz Festival Line-ups, 1979-2008
 JazzTimes Review of 2015 fest, by Philip Booth
 

1978 establishments in Illinois
Recurring events established in 1978
Jazz festivals in the United States
Music festivals in Chicago
Summer festivals